José Sabino Chagas Monteiro (born 25 October 1996), known as Sabino, is a Brazilian footballer who plays as a central defender for Sport Recife.

Club career

Santos

Early career
Born in Brasília, Federal District but raised in Santa Rita de Cássia, Bahia, Sabino joined Santos' youth setup in 2012 at the age of 13. He made his senior debut with the reserves on 30 August 2017, starting in a 1–0 Copa Paulista away loss against Portuguesa.

On 28 September 2017, Sabino renewed his contract until September 2022. He scored his first senior goal on 8 August 2018, netting a brace in a 5–2 away routing of Bragantino.

Coritiba (loan)
On 28 January 2019, Sabino was loaned to Série B side Coritiba for the season. He made his professional debut on 30 January 2019, starting in a 2–1 Campeonato Paranaense away win against Athletico Paranaense.

Sabino scored his first professional goal on 10 February 2019, netting the equalizer in a 2–2 away draw against Operário Ferroviário. He became an undisputed starter in the club's promotion campaign, scoring four goals in 30 league appearances.

In January 2020, Sabino's loan was extended for a further season. He made his top tier debut on 9 August by starting in a 1–0 home loss against Internacional, and scored his first goal in the category on the 23rd, netting the equalizer in a 2–1 away win against Red Bull Bragantino, through a penalty kick.

Sabino was a regular starter for the club during the 2020 Série A, as the club suffered relegation.

2021 season
On 21 December 2020, while still on loan at Coritiba, Sabino renewed his contract with Santos until December 2024. He returned to the club after his loan expired in March 2021, being registered in the main squad for the 2021 Campeonato Paulista.

Sabino made his first team debut for Peixe on 3 March 2021, starting and scoring the opener in a 1–1 Campeonato Paulista home draw against Ferroviária. On 9 April, after the value of his wages was considered too high by the club's new board (the values on the renewal were agreed under the previous administration), Santos rescinded his contract with the club, but also retained 10% over a future sale.

Sport Recife
Immediately after leaving Santos, Sabino was announced at fellow top tier side Sport Recife.

Personal life
Sabino's father Kédimo Melo was also a footballer, who notably played for Tiradentes-DF and Portuguesa Santista.

Career statistics

References

External links

1996 births
Living people
Footballers from Brasília
Brazilian footballers
Association football defenders
Campeonato Brasileiro Série A players
Campeonato Brasileiro Série B players
Santos FC players
Coritiba Foot Ball Club players
Sport Club do Recife players